Justin Stewart Kane (born 21 December 1981 in Ferntree Gully, Victoria) is a bantamweight boxer from Australia, who won the gold medal in the men's bantamweight division at the 2002 Commonwealth Games in Manchester, United Kingdom. He represented his native country at the 2000 Summer Olympics, losing in the quarterfinals to Sergey Danilchenko from Ukraine.

He was an Australian Institute of Sport scholarship holder.

Olympic results 
1st round bye
Defeated Sontaya Wongprates (Thailand) 15-13
Lost to Sergey Danilchenko (Ukraine) RSC 4

References

External links

 Profile
 

1981 births
Living people
Bantamweight boxers
Boxers at the 2000 Summer Olympics
Boxers at the 2002 Commonwealth Games
Olympic boxers of Australia
Sportsmen from Victoria (Australia)
Commonwealth Games gold medallists for Australia
Australian Institute of Sport boxers
Australian male boxers
Commonwealth Games medallists in boxing
People from Ferntree Gully, Victoria
Boxers from Melbourne
Medallists at the 2002 Commonwealth Games